Tha Aye is a former member of the State Peace and Development Council (SPDC) and former Chief Minister of Sagaing Region. He is a former military officer, with the rank of Major General and previously serving as SPDC’s Chief of Bureau of Special Operations 1 until a reshuffle on 27 August 2010.

Tha Aye won an uncontested seat in the Sagaing Region Hluttaw during the 2010 Burmese general election, representing Budalin Township Constituency No. 2 under the Union Solidarity and Development Party banner. He was subsequently appointed to Chief Minister of Sagaing Region.

Tha Aye was born on 16 February 1945. He is married to Wai Wai Khaing.

References

1945 births
Burmese military personnel
Burmese politicians
Living people
Union Solidarity and Development Party politicians